Scheduled Banks in India refer to those banks which have been included in the Second Schedule of Reserve Bank of India Act, 1934. Reserve Bank of India (RBI) in turn includes only those banks in this Schedule which satisfy  all the criteria laid down vide section 42(6)(a) of the said Act.
Banks not under this Schedule are called Non-Scheduled Banks

Facilities
Every Scheduled bank enjoys two  types of principal facilities: it becomes eligible for debts/loans at the bank rate from the RBI; and, it automatically acquires the membership of clearing house.

Types of banks
There are two main categories of commercial banks in India namely -
 Scheduled Commercial banks
 Scheduled Co-operative banks
Scheduled commercial Banks are further divided into 6 types as below -

 Scheduled Public Sector Banks
 Scheduled Private Sector Banks
 Scheduled Small Finance Banks
 Regional Rural Banks
 Foreign Banks
 Payment banks (currently five banks NSDL Payments Bank, Airtel Payments Bank, Fino Payments Bank, India Post Payments Bank, Paytm Payments Bank have been granted Scheduled bank status).

Scheduled Co-operative banks are further divided into 2 types namely:

 Scheduled State Co-operative banks
 Scheduled Urban Co-operative banks

See also
 Banking in India
 List of banks in India

References

Further reading
 

Banking in India